The World Table Tennis Championships are table tennis competitions sanctioned by the International Table Tennis Federation (ITTF). The World Championships have been held since 1926, biennially since 1957. Five individual events, which include men's singles, women's singles, men's doubles, women's double and mixed doubles, are currently held in odd numbered years. The World Team Table Tennis Championships, which include men's team and women's team events, were first their own competition in 2000. The Team Championships are held in even numbered years.

In the earlier days of the tournament, Hungary's men's team was a dominant force, winning the championships 12 times. This was followed by a short period of dominance by Japan in the 1950s. From the 1960s onwards, China emerged as the new dominant power in this tournament and, with the exception of 1989–2000, when Sweden won four times, China continues to dominate the sport. China's men's team holds a record 22 world team championship titles.

In the 1950s, Japan's women team was a force to be reckoned with winning a total of 8 titles. The Chinese women started their strong grip on the world team championships from the 1970s onwards. They have only lost twice since 1975. China holds 22 women's team titles.

Trophies

There are 7 different trophies presented to the winners of the various events, held by winning associations, and returned for the next world championships.
 Team competition:
Swaythling Cup for men's team, donated in 1926 by Lady Baroness Swaythling, mother of the first ITTF president, Ivor Montagu
Corbillon Cup for women's team, donated in 1933 by Marcel Corbillon, president of the French Table Tennis Association. The original Cup was won by German team in 1939, and disappeared during Berlin occupation after World War II; the current Corbillon Cup is a replica made in 1949.
 Singles competition:
St. Bride Vase for men's singles, donated in 1929 by C.Corti Woodcock, member of the exclusive St. Bride Table Tennis Club in London, after Fred Perry of England won the title in Budapest
Geist Prize for women's singles, donated in 1931 by Dr. Gaspar Geist, president of the Hungarian Table Tennis Association
 Doubles competition:
Iran Cup for men's doubles; first presented at the 1947 World Championships by the Shah of Iran
W.J. Pope Trophy for women's doubles; donated in 1948 by the ITTF honorary general secretary W.J. Pope
Heydusek Cup for mixed doubles; donated in 1948 by Zdenek Heydusek, secretary of the Czechoslovakia Association.

In addition, the Egypt Cup is presented to the next host of world championships. The Cup was donated by King Farouk of Egypt in 1939, when the championships were held in Cairo, Egypt.

Championships
The ITTF held individual events and team events separately for the first time in 1999 and 2000 respectively, and 2001 was the last time individual and team events were held together. Starting in 2003 individual events and team events were held separately again and each continue to be held separately every other year.

 Since 1929 to 2020 open for all players and teams.
 Since 2021: 128 Players and 32teams qualified in individual and team games. (in 2021 because of covide conditions have not qualifications and 128 player invited for games with ranking but for 2023 and next have separate qualification + 2022 team games have qualification).

 Individual events
 Team events

All-time medal table

Updated after the 2022 World Team Table Tennis Championships. Doubles pairs from different associations were counted as a half a point.

Multiple medalists

Top medalists ordered by number of gold medals at the World Table Tennis Championships (including at team events) are listed below. 11 men won at least nine gold medals and 11 women with a minimum of eight.

Men

Women

See also
Table tennis at the Summer Olympics
Table Tennis World Cup
ITTF World Tour
ITTF World Tour Grand Finals

References

External links

ITTF Museum

 
Table tennis competitions
Table tennis
Recurring sporting events established in 1926
Biennial sporting events